Aivar Riisalu (born 13 March 1961, Märjamaa) is an Estonian singer, businessman and politician. He has been member of XI and XII Riigikogu.

He was the singer for the popular ensemble Meie Mees. He is a member of Estonian Centre Party.

References

Living people
1961 births
20th-century Estonian male singers
Estonian businesspeople
Estonian Centre Party politicians
Members of the Riigikogu, 2007–2011
Members of the Riigikogu, 2011–2015
Tallinn University of Technology alumni
People from Märjamaa